Campeonato Paulista Série B3 was the sixth level of the São Paulo state professional football championship, one of the Brazilian state championships.

List of champions 
 2001 - Corinthians B (São Paulo)
 2002 - Jabaquara (Santos)
 2003 - Força (Caieiras)

See also 
Campeonato Paulista
Campeonato Paulista Série A2
Campeonato Paulista Série A3
Campeonato Paulista Segunda Divisão
Campeonato Paulista Série B2
Federação Paulista de Futebol

References

External links 
 RSSSF (list of champions)
 RSSSF (list of participants)

Paulista Serie B3
6